Diswood is an unincorporated community in Alexander County, Illinois, United States. Diswood is located on the eastern edge of the Shawnee National Forest west of Tamms.

The Egyptian Community Unit School District facilities are south of Diswood.

References

Unincorporated communities in Alexander County, Illinois
Unincorporated communities in Illinois
Cape Girardeau–Jackson metropolitan area